"Come Back, Lucy" (retitled Mirror of Danger in the US) was a story written by author Pamela Sykes in 1973. In 1978, it served as the basis of Come Back Lucy, a British television show produced by ATV.

Synopsis
"Come Back, Lucy" centred on a little girl named Lucy who lived with her Aunt Olive in an old Victorian house. Upon the death of her aunt and the subsequent loss of her home, Lucy is welcomed into her cousins' house though she does not know them very well and has difficulty feeling at home. As time moves on, Lucy is visited by the ghost of a Victorian little girl who wishes for Lucy to become her friend.

References

External links
 
1973 British novels
Ghost novels
Hamish Hamilton books
1978 British television series debuts
1978 British television series endings
Television shows produced by Associated Television (ATV)
1970s British children's television series
Television series about ghosts